Monfort Cemetery is located  east of the intersection of Port Washington Boulevard (NY 101) and Main Street in Port Washington, New York, United States. It contains 118 graves of some of the earliest Dutch settlers of Cow Neck (as today's Port Washington was then known) and their descendants, buried from 1737 to 1892. It was added to the National Register of Historic Places in 1988.

The cemetery is a small, nearly square plot surrounded by tall oak trees. It is fenced off and locked, not open to the public. The graves are arranged in 13 rows by family.

Originally it was part of the 110 acre (44 ha) Rapelje farm. The  property was separated from Rapelje's farm and sold in July, 1786 to members of the Onderdonk, Schenck, Hegeman and Dodge families. The earliest-dated markers are those of Andries Onderdonk and his wife Geertruy, which date to 1731 and 1738 respectively. Other bodies were reburied there prior to the Rapeljes' sale of the property and its official designation as a cemetery in 1796.

All headstones face west. The markers, mostly sandstone but for a few in marble, show a variation in styles consistent with their time periods. Eighteenth-century markers are sandstone detailed with "soul effigies", a tripartite lobed top with a face in the center and other decoration in the wings. By the end of that century and the beginning of the next, the lobed top was plain, the inscriptions began with "In Memory" or "In Memoriam", and there are at least two marble headstones with the willow-and-urn motif common in neoclassical gravestones from the 1820s on. The last graves, from the late 19th century, are made of unadorned marble, common to that time. All the tombstones seem to rise naturally out of the ground, moldy and ancient.

The Monforts, one of the families with ancestors buried in the cemetery, owned and continued to maintain the cemetery not only throughout its period of active use but for almost a century thereafter. In 1984 Burtis Monfort transferred it to the town of North Hempstead, which has maintained it ever since.

Notable burials

Some of those buried at Monfort played important roles in early local history. Martin Schenck (1740–1793) was one of the signers of North Hempstead's Declaration of Independence from then-Loyalist Hempstead during the Revolution. Andrew Onderdonk (1756–1793) was a captain in the militia and later a New York State Senator. Joseph Onderdonk (1766–1852) was present at George Washington's inauguration as a young man and would later introduce modern techniques to local agriculture and serve as a district highway supervisor for North Hempstead. In addition, Henry Onderdonk Jr. (died 1886) was a Long Island historian who married his first cousin, Maria Onderdonk and wrote such books as "Revolutionary Incidents of Queens County."

References

Cemeteries on the National Register of Historic Places in New York (state)
1731 establishments in the Province of New York
Town of North Hempstead, New York
Cemeteries in Nassau County, New York
National Register of Historic Places in Nassau County, New York